Ecuadorian cuisine is diverse, varying with altitude and associated agricultural conditions. Ecuadorian cuisine is an amalgamation of Spanish, Andean, and Amazonian cuisines and to a lesser degree Italian, Lebanese, African, and Chinese. Beef, chicken, and seafood are popular in the coastal regions, especially ceviche, and are typically served with carbohydrate-rich foods, such as rice accompanied with lentils, pasta, or plantain. In the mountainous regions pork, chicken, beef and cuy (guinea pig) are popular and are often served with rice, maize, or potatoes. A wide variety of fresh fruit is available, particularly at lower altitudes, including , passionfruit, several types of banana, and tree tomato.

The starchy root is peeled and boiled, fried, or used in a variety of other dishes. Across the nation it is also used as a bread, pan de yuca, which is analogous to the Brazilian pão de queijo and its often consumed alongside different types of drinkable yogurt. Many fruits are available in this region, including bananas, tree-grapes, and peach-palms.

Typical meal
Most regions in Ecuador follow the traditional three-course meal of sopa/soup and segundo/second dish which includes rice or pasta and a protein such as meat, poultry, pig or fish. Then dessert and a coffee are customary. Dinner is usually lighter and sometimes just coffee or agua de remedio/herbal tea with bread.

For the most part, Ecuador is known not only for its bananas, and all the dishes made from them, but for its starch consumption of products like potato, bread, pasta, rice, and yuca. Traditionally any of these ingredients can be found in either the soup or the rice platter that may be served.

Beverages

Catholic influence
Besides the regions, there are several typical Ecuadorian dishes consumed on special occasions. , a fish soup including several types of beans, lentils, and corn, is often eaten during Lent and Easter, and is traditionally served all over Ecuador.

Chifa
Chifa (from the Mandarin words 吃饭, meaning "to eat rice") is the Ecuadorian term for Ecuadorian-Chinese food (or for an Ecuadorian-Chinese fusion restaurant). Because many Chinese ingredients are hard to find in Ecuador, the Chinese modified their cuisine and incorporated many Ecuadorian elements (mainly Spanish, Indigenous, and African) into their cuisine, and the popularity of chifa has made it hard to find authentic Chinese cuisine in Ecuador.

Middle Eastern

Since 1875, there has been a constant flow of Lebanese immigrants to Ecuador, first fleeing the Ottoman Empire, and then the aftermath of World War I and II. By 1986, there were 97,500 Lebanese immigrants in Ecuador. Shawarma restaurants have become increasingly popular presenting another instance of fusion cuisine. Since many of the ingredient in Middle Eastern cuisine cannot be found in the country, Lebanese immigrants have made replacements with native ingredients. One dish that has become a staple of the country is kibbeh. 

One beloved Middle Eastern food that has become synonymous with Ecuadorian cuisine are yogurt drinks. The most famous are "yogures persa" brought by Persian immigrants in the 1900s. These yogurt drinks are most often accompanied by pan de yuca, which are analogous to Brazilian pão de queijo.

Desserts

Alfajores: a dessert found in virtually all of Spain's former colonies. It is derived from the versions popular in Spain during the colonial period. The original Spanish recipes, however, have been modified. The basic recipe uses a base mix of flour, margarine, and powdered sugar, which is oven-baked. Alfajores consist of two or more layers of this baked pastry, and is usually filled with dulce de leche (a caramel-colored, sweet, creamy filling made with milk and sugar)

Turrones (or nougat) is another originally Spanish dessert. 

Arroz con leche (rice pudding): Another dessert originally from Spain that can be found in various varieties throughout Latin America. Arroz con leche is one of the more common desserts found in homes and restaurants of modern-day Ecuador. It consists primarily of cooked rice, cinnamon/nutmeg, raisins, and milk.

Helados de Paila (ice cream): Helado de paila is a sorbet-like specialty that hails from Ibarra. It comes in an array of flavors, and it is made with fruit juice, ice, sugar, and sometimes fruits. All the ingredients are traditionally churned by hand inside a large bronze or copper pot (paila) that is placed on ice. It is said that this frozen treat was initially made with the snow from the glacier on top of the Imbabura volcano. Allegedly, Rosalía Suárez first collected the ice, and her descendants still keep the tradition alive and run an ice cream shop in Ibarra.

Panetón or Panettone: is a type of sweet bread with dried fruit. It was popularized by Italian immigrants that arrived in the country in the late 1800s. It is usually served for breakfast around Christmas with a cup of hot chocolate. They used to come in big boxes only with huge panetóns inside but now they also sell personal portions. Because Christmas is the hottest time of year, people often replace the hot chocolate with coffee or a drink that's served cold.

Flan: Is a popular custard dessert with a layer of clear caramel sauce.

Drinks

Fioravanti is a fruit-flavored, carbonated soft drink first sold in 1878 in Ecuador. It is notable for being one of the first soft drinks commercially sold. In 1991, it was acquired by The Coca-Cola Company.

Güitig is a mineral water widely consumed around the country at times supplanting tap water as the drink of choice.

See also

 List of Ecuadorian dishes and foods

References